The inauguration of Fidel V. Ramos as the twelfth president of the Philippines took place on Tuesday, June 30, 1992, at the Quirino Grandstand in Manila. The oath of office was administered by Chief Justice of the Supreme Court of the Philippines Andres Narvasa.

The Inauguration was organized jointly by the Presidential Transition Cooperation Team of outgoing President Corazon Aquino and the Transition Team of incoming President Ramos.

Context

Oath of office
Ramos took his oath office on June 30, 1992, at the Quirino Grandstand in Manila and as mandated by the Constitution, this took place at noon. The oath of office was administered by Supreme Court Chief Justice Andres Narvasa. This is also the first inauguration after the 1987 constitution and the first inauguration after the 1986 EDSA Revolution.

Inaugural event
The inauguration took place at the Quirino Grandstand as mentioned by president Corazon Aquino on her final State of the Nation Address in 1991. Among those in attendance were outgoing president Corazon Aquino, vice president Salvador Laurel, former president Diosdado Macapagal and former first lady Eva Macapagal.

Presidency of Fidel V. Ramos
Ramos, Fidel
1992 in the Philippines